Newtonville is an unincorporated community in Buena Vista Township in Atlantic County, New Jersey, United States. Newtonville has a post office with ZIP code 08346.

Demographics

References

Buena Vista Township, New Jersey
Unincorporated communities in Atlantic County, New Jersey
Unincorporated communities in New Jersey